In enzymology, a glutamin-(asparagin-)ase is an enzyme that catalyzes the chemical reaction

L-glutamine + H2O  L-glutamate + NH3

Thus, the two substrates of this enzyme are L-glutamine and H2O, whereas its two products are L-glutamate and NH3.

This enzyme belongs to the family of hydrolases, those acting on carbon-nitrogen bonds other than peptide bonds, specifically in linear amides.  The systematic name of this enzyme class is L-glutamine(L-asparagine) amidohydrolase. This enzyme participates in 4 metabolic pathways: glutamate metabolism, alanine and aspartate metabolism, d-glutamine and d-glutamate metabolism, and nitrogen metabolism.

Structural studies

References

 

EC 3.5.1
Enzymes of known structure